Cabauw is a village in the Dutch province of Utrecht. It is part of the municipality of Lopik, and lies about 12 km southwest of IJsselstein. Cabauw consists of a small village centre, and a ribbon of farms along the Lopikerwetering canal, between Zevender and Lopik.

Cabauw used to be a separate municipality. In 1857, it became a part of the municipality of Willige Langerak, which in its turn was merged into Lopik in 1943. Cabauw is and has long been a catholic enclave within a predominantly Protestant region.

History 
It was first mentioned in 1254 as inden Cabbau, and means dispute. The reason why the land was disputed is unknown. Cabauw is a linear settlement which started as a peat excavation concession. In 1840, it was home to 121 people. The Catholic church was built in 1928.

The wind mill Middelste Molen also known as Cabauwse Molen is a polder mill from 1773. It was a replacement of an earlier wind mill. There used to 41 polder mills in the polder, however the Middelste Molen is the only one remaining. In 1962, it was replaced by a Diesel powered pumping station, however it remained as a backup, and is still occasionally in service.

Gallery

Climate

References

Populated places in Utrecht (province)
Former municipalities of Utrecht (province)
Lopik